Playwrights '56, a.k.a. The Playwright Hour, is a 60-minute live American dramatic anthology series produced by Fred Coe for Showtime Productions. Twenty episodes aired on NBC from October 4, 1955, to June 19, 1956. It shared a Thursday time slot with Armstrong Circle Theatre.

Stars included Mary Astor, Ralph Bellamy, Joan Blondell, George Chandler, Robert Culp, Paul Douglas, Tom Ewell, Norman Fell, Nina Foch, John Forsythe, Lillian Gish, Alice Ghostley, Lee Grant, James Gregory, Louis Jean Heydt, Steven Hill, Vivi Janiss, Henry Jones, E. G. Marshall, John McGiver, Steve McQueen, Dina Merrill, Jack Mullaney, Paul Newman, Phyllis Kirk, Edmond O'Brien, J. Pat O'Malley, Nehemiah Persoff, Tom Poston, Peter Mark Richman, Janice Rule, Kim Stanley, Warren Stevens, Karl Swenson, Franchot Tone, Ethel Waters, James Whitmore, Estelle Winwood, Jane Wyatt, and Dick York.

Among its notable writers were Horton Foote, Gore Vidal, Tad Mosel, Arnold Schulman, and A. E. Hotchner. Directors included Arthur Penn, later renowned for Bonnie and Clyde, and Delbert Mann, the 1955 Academy Award winner for directing Marty.

The program was sponsored by Pontiac automobiles. When it was canceled, an article in the trade publication Billboard cited cost as a factor, noting that it "ran about $30,000 a week more than its more successful counterpart". Most of the episodes originated  from WRCA-TV in Brooklyn, New York, with the rest coming from KRCA-TV's Hollywood studios. After the program's June 19, 1956, broadcast, it was replaced by The Kaiser Aluminum Hour.

Along with Producers' Showcase, Playwrights '56 shared the 1956 prime-time Emmy for Best Art Direction -Live Series.

References

External links

Playwrights '56 at CVTA with list of episode

1950s American anthology television series
1955 American television series debuts
1956 American television series endings
American live television series
Black-and-white American television shows
NBC original programming
Primetime Emmy Award winners